Eprius is a genus of skipper butterflies in the family Hesperiidae.

Species
Eprius repens Evans, 1955
Eprius repta Evans, 1955
Eprius veleda Godman, 1901

References
Natural History Museum Lepidoptera genus database

Hesperiidae
Monotypic butterfly genera
Hesperiidae genera